Paayum Oli Nee Yennaku is an upcoming Indian Tamil-language action thriller film written and directed by Karthik Adwait under the banner of Karthik Movie House. The film stars Vikram Prabhu and Vani Bhojan in the lead roles.

Cast 
Vikram Prabhu as Aravind
Vani Bhojan
Dhananjaya
Anand
Vela Ramamoorthy
Vivek Prasanna

Production

Casting 
The project was announced by newcomer Karthik Adwait as his debut directorial venture. In 2020, Vikram Prabhu signed the film after the success of Vaanam Kottattum. In April 2020, Vani Bhojan was signed in as the female lead. Kannada actor Dhananjaya (in his Tamil debut) was also signed to play a crucial role in this film.

Filming 
The shooting of the film was wrapped in April 2021.

Music 
The film music is composed by Sagar Mahati. The first single "Anicha Poove" was released on 9 June 2022.

References

External links 
 

Upcoming Tamil-language films
Indian drama films